The 1999–00 Romanian Hockey League season was the 70th season of the Romanian Hockey League. Seven teams participated in the league, and SC Miercurea Ciuc won the championship.

Regular season

Playoffs

3rd place
Rapid Bucharest - Progym Gheorgheni (11-8, 2-6, 4-2, 7-4)

Final
SC Miercurea Ciuc - CSA Steaua Bucuresti (5-4, 8-0, 7-3)

External links
Season on hockeyarchives.info

Romanian Hockey League seasons
Romanian
Rom